Drax Project is a New Zealand pop and R&B band that formed in Te Aro, Wellington in 2014. Recording a mix of jazz, R&B and pop music, the band came to prominence in 2017 with the single "Woke Up Late", which was certified triple platinum by RIANZ while the 2019 version featuring Hailee Steinfeld was certified triple platinum in Australia.

Background
Most of Drax Project's members went to school together in Porirua and began as buskers in Central Wellington in 2013, composed of Shaan Singh on saxophone and Matt Beachen on drums (the origin of the band's name is a portmanteau of 'drums' and 'sax'). Drax Project mostly performed pop song covers while busking at Courtenay Place, Wellington and performing at local bars and events. Double bassist Sam Thomson joined shortly after, and guitarist Ben O'Leary joined the band a year after, when the band made the switch to creating original material. All members were jazz students at the New Zealand School of Music, except for O'Leary who studied music at Whitireia New Zealand.

In August 2014, the band released their first extended play to Bandcamp. A friend of O'Leary's produced the extended play as a part of his final year assignment for music school. The exposure from the extended play allowed Drax Project to be booked for summer festivals in 2014–2015. In 2016, the group released their second extended play, T/W/OO, through Universal. It was produced by founding Shapeshifter member Devin Abrams. The extended play's first single "Cold" was successful on Spotify, reaching #1 on their viral chart and being streamed over 160,000 times in three months. In 2017, Drax Project opened for Lorde's Auckland concert of her Melodrama World Tour in November 2017, as well as New Zealand band Six60.

In November 2017, the band released the song "Woke Up Late". It gained popularity over the next few months on Spotify and was widely played on New Zealand radio stations. In March, Drax Project opened for Ed Sheeran's three Auckland performances of his ÷ Tour in March 2018 (currently the largest-scale concert held in New Zealand as of 2018). By April, "Woke Up Late" had been certified Platinum by the RIANZ. In March, the band were featured on "Light", the third single from U.S. rapper Famous Dex's 2018 album Dex Meets Dexter. In June 2018, the group opened for the European leg of Camila Cabello's Never Be the Same Tour.

In January 2019, a new version of "Woke Up Late" was released, featuring American singer Hailee Steinfeld. In June 2019, they released the single "All This Time". The group opened for Christina Aguilera during her 2019 European concert tour. In September 2019, the group released the single "Catching Feelings" with Six60. Their debut, self-titled studio album was released on 27 September 2019. They released the single "Firefly" featuring Fetty Wap and AACACIA in October 2020.

Discography

Studio albums

Extended plays

Singles

As lead artist

As featured artist

Other charted songs

Tours
Supporting
Melodrama World Tour (for Lorde) (2017)
÷ Tour (for Ed Sheeran) (2018)
Never Be the Same Tour (for Camila Cabello) (2018)
The X Tour (for Christina Aguilera) (2019)

Notes

References

External links
 
 
 

Musical groups established in 2013
Musical groups from Wellington
New Zealand pop music groups
New Zealand contemporary R&B musical groups
2013 establishments in New Zealand
Māori-language singers